This is a list of banks in Syria.

Central bank 
 Central Bank of Syria

Local banks

Public
 Commercial Bank of Syria
 Industrial Bank of Syria
 Agricultural Cooperative Bank
 Popular Credit Bank
 Real Estate Bank
 Saving Bank

Private and foreign
 Bank of Syria and Overseas
 Banque Bemo Saudi Fransi
 Byblos Bank
 Popular Credit Bank
 Syria Gulf Bank
 Bank Audi
 The International Bank for Trade & Finance
 Arab Bank
 Qatar National Bank

Islamic banks
 Syria International Islamic Bank
 Cham Bank
 Al-Baraka Bank Syria

See also 
 Banking in Syria
 List of banks in the Arab world

Syria
Banks
Banks

Syria